Harsh Rajput is an Indian television actor who is best known as Ansh Rathod in Nazar and now notably as Rocky in Pishachini.

Early life
Rajput hails from Navsari. He faced a hard time when he came to Mumbai. He had language problem and was difficult for him to adopt to that culture. Slowly, he got adapted.

Career
He made his television debut with Dharti Ka Veer Yodha Prithviraj Chauhan on StarPlus. He also starred in shows like Dharm Veer, Hitler Didi and Crazy Stupid Ishq where he landed his first lead role. Harsh has also acted in several episodic shows such as Pyaar Tune Kya Kiya and Yeh Hai Aashiqui. He also played a role in Most Popular Serial Saath Nibhaana Saathiya. He was seen playing the lead role of Ansh Rathod in StarPlus' supernatural show Nazar, produced by 4 Lions Films and opposite with Niyati Fatnani. He then played the lead role in Colors TV's show Kuch Toh Hai: Naagin Ek Naye Rang Mein which is a spin-off to the Naagin 5.

Since August 2022, he is playing the role of Rakshit "Rocky" opposite Jiya Shankar and Nyra Banerjee in Colors TV show Pishachini.

Filmography

Films

Television

Special appearances

References

External links
 

Year of birth missing (living people)
Living people
21st-century Indian male actors
Indian male television actors
Male actors in Hindi cinema
Male actors in Hindi television
Male actors from Gujarat